Edda Andrésdóttir (born 28 December 1952) is an Icelandic journalist, news anchor and writer.

Edda was born to Svava Jónsdóttir, a housewife, and Andrés Magnússon, a foreman at Hvalur hf. She grew up on Kleppsvegur in Reykjavík but spent all summers with her grandmother in Kirkjubær in Vestmannaeyjar. She started working as a journalist for the newspaper Vísir in 1971 and worked there until 1978. Along with her journalism, she produced programs for radio and television. For a while, she was the editor of the magazine Hús og híbýli, a news anchor and television program creator at RÚV and a journalist at Helgarpósturinn. In 1990, Edda started working at Stöð 2 as a news anchor and program creator. On 11 August 2022, she retired from news anchoring.

Personal life
Edda's husband is Stefán Ólafsson, professor of sociology at the University of Iceland. Edda and Stefán have two sons together, and Edda has one son from a previous relationship.

Bibliography 
Á Gljúfrasteini (1984)
Auður Eir. Sólin kemur alltaf upp á ný (2005)
Í öðru landi, saga úr lífinu (2007)
Til Eyja (2013)

References

1952 births
Living people
Edda Andrésdóttir
Edda Andrésdóttir
Edda Andrésdóttir